Sebiumeker was a major supreme god of procreation and fertility in Meroe, Kush, in present-day Sudan. He is sometimes thought of as a guardian of gateways as his statues are sometimes found near doorways. He has many similarities with Atum, but has Nubian characteristics, and is also considered the god of agriculture.

Etymology
His Meroitic name was probably Sabomakal, which became Sebiumeker in the ancient Egyptian language.

Role in ancient Kush
Sebiumeker was a major supreme god of procreation and fertility in Meroe, Kush (present-day Sudan).

He was referred to as Lord of Musawwarat. His statues have often been found near doorways at the Nubian sites Tabo (Nubia) and Musawwarat es-Sufra, giving rise to the interpretation that he was a guardian god. But another interpretation is that he represented transformation which is why he was placed at the doorways of temples.

Though certainly a Nubian god, he has many Egyptian symbols and legends.

Family
His partner (or maybe brother) was Arensnuphis. This close association with Arensnuphis is similar to the relationship with Set and Osiris.

Image
He wore the ancient double crown with a beard and uraeus and had big ears, a mark of importance. With his double crown, false beard, kilt, and tunic, he resembles Atum.

A sandstone head without inscription stands in Meroe. It also has the double crown with uraeus. It has several Egyptian looking features, but also has the formal broad Nubian unmodeled planes.

In popular culture
His worship is invoked in the Gifts of the Nile scenario in the strategy video game Civilization VI.

References

Egyptian gods
Fertility gods
Liminal deities
Nubian gods